Jean II (1468 – 11 October 1505) was Lord of Monaco from March 1494 until his death. He was the eldest son of Lambert Grimaldi (1420–1494) and Claudine Grimaldi (1451–1515).

During his 11-year reign, he pursued the politics of his father. He was made lieutenant of the Riviera by King Charles VIII of France.

Jean married Antonia of Savoy, illegitimate daughter of the Duke of Savoy and his mistress Libera Portoneri, in 1486. They had a daughter named Marie.

He was murdered by his brother Lucien, who then became Lord of Monaco.

References 

1468 births
1505 deaths
15th-century Lords of Monaco
16th-century Lords of Monaco
House of Grimaldi
Lords of Monaco
Burials at the Cathedral of Our Lady Immaculate
Assassinated Monegasque people
People murdered in Monaco
People of Ligurian descent
Fratricides